The New York World Journal Tribune (WJT, and hence the nickname The Widget) was an evening daily newspaper published in New York City from September 1966 until May 1967. The World Journal Tribune represented an attempt to save the heritages of several historic New York City newspapers by merging the city's three mid-market papers (the Journal-American, the World-Telegram and Sun and the Herald Tribune) together into a consolidated newspaper.

Background
The late 1940s and the 1950s were a troubled time for newspapers throughout North America. Newspapers had acquired a new competitor for the eyes and ears of the nation, television. Competition from radio and magazines for the news audience also continued unabated. The market for evening papers in particular was affected by television and by the suburban lifestyle, but all papers were affected by it. The New York media market was by far America's largest at the time (by an even larger margin than it is currently) and had by far the most daily newspapers. Mergers had been ongoing for several years.  In the 1960s the market became even more competitive, forcing the closure of the Hearst-owned New York Daily Mirror in 1963. The newspaper industry was struggling with financial troubles by the mid-1960s and had warned their unions, some of the more militant in the city at the time, that they could not survive yet another strike following devastating walk-outs in 1962–1963 and 1965.

Merger
In April 1966, in an attempt to avoid closing down, the Scripps-Howard owned New York World-Telegram and Sun merged with Hearst's New York Journal-American and the New York Herald Tribune to become the New York World Journal Tribune, an evening broadsheet newspaper which would rely on newsstand sales to survive.

The management of the merged paper told their employees that to succeed the new enterprise would need concessions from the unions, but the unions, upset that several thousand workers were planned to be laid-off, demanded their own concessions from management. The result of the impasse was a 140-day strike which delayed the debut of the new paper until September 12, 1966.

Closing
The World Journal Tribune never became economically viable, and it ceased publication eight months later, on May 5, 1967.  During its short life, the paper never opened a Washington bureau, and did not have any foreign correspondents on its staff, relying instead on the Los Angeles Times–Washington Post News Service for foreign coverage.

The folding of the WJT left The New York Times, the New York Daily News, and the New York Post as the only daily English-language general circulation newspapers in New York City for many years, when in 1900 there had been fifteen.

One survivor of the demise of the World Journal Tribune was New York magazine, which began as the Sunday supplement for the Herald Tribune and continued after the merger as the supplement for the WJT.  After the newspaper folded, the editor of New York, Clay Felker, bought the rights to the title with partners and brought it out as a glossy magazine.

See also
Journalism
Newspaper
Joint operating agreement (JOA)

Notes

External links

World Journal Tribune clipping reference archive
World Journal Tribune (domain name for sale in 2019)

Defunct newspapers published in New York City
Publications disestablished in 1967
1966 establishments in New York City
1967 disestablishments in New York (state)
Daily newspapers published in New York City